Hayden James Cann is an English professional footballer who plays as a defender for Gainsborough Trinity on loan from Lincoln City.

Career

Lincoln City
Hayden joined Lincoln City at the age of 8 years old. He made his debut as a substitute in an EFL trophy game against Mansfield Town on 6 October 2020. The day after making his debut, he would sign his first professional contract, signing a 3-year deal.

On the 11 August 2021, he joined Gainsborough Trinity on loan with Lincoln City teammate Jovon Makama. On 14 January 2022, he joined Lincoln United on loan with team mate Bobby Deane. On 10 August 2022, he rejoined Gainsborough Trinity on loan for the duration of the season.

Career statistics

References 

Living people
English footballers
Association football defenders
Lincoln City F.C. players
Gainsborough Trinity F.C. players
Lincoln United F.C. players
2003 births